Bharat Nalluri (born 1965) is a British–Indian film and television director.

Personal life
Nalluri was born in India.  He moved to England at a young age with his family and grew up in Newcastle upon Tyne, where he attended the Royal Grammar School, Newcastle. He has an MA in Film from The Northern School of Film and Television.

He is married to journalist Kylie Morris, the former Washington correspondent for the UK's Channel 4 News.

Career

Nalluri directed a miniseries for HBO called Tsunami: The Aftermath, for which he was nominated for a Primetime Emmy. This two-part drama starring Chiwetel Ejiofor, Sophie Okenedo, Tim Roth, Hugh Bonneville and Toni Collette,  told the story of the tragic events that occurred in Thailand in December 2004.  Ejiofor and Okenedo garnered NAACP nominations for best supporting  actor and best actress, which Okenedo went on to win. Toni Collette was nominated for a Golden Globe for best supporting actress.

In 2014, he directed the pilot for Emmy nominated TV series The 100 for Warner Bros and The CW. It is currently in its 7th season.

In addition to his television work Nalluri has worked extensively in film.
In 2007, Nalluri directed the feature film Miss Pettigrew Lives for a Day starring Amy Adams and Frances McDormand which had a successful theatrical release in the U.S. 
In 2014 he returned to Spooks (aka MI-5), which had by this time finished its ten-season run, to direct the feature film spin-off Spooks: The Greater Good. It starred Kit Harington.
His latest film is The Man Who Invented Christmas, starring Dan Stevens, Christopher Plummer and Jonathan Pryce  and was released by Bleecker Street in November 2017.

Filmography
The Man Who Invented Christmas (2017)
Spooks: The Greater Good (2015)
Miss Pettigrew Lives for a Day (2008)
The Crow: Salvation (2000)
Killing Time (1998)
Downtime (1997)

References

External links

Review roundup of Nalluri's "Miss Pettigrew Lives for a Day".

British television directors
British film directors
People educated at the Royal Grammar School, Newcastle upon Tyne
British people of Indian descent
Living people
1965 births